Anthony Albright (born April 2, 1962) is a Minnesota politician and member of the Minnesota House of Representatives. A member of the Republican Party of Minnesota, he represents District 55B in the southwestern Twin Cities metropolitan area.  On August 2, he announced that he would resign on August 5, 2022, following outcry regarding his comments about abortion rights.

Education
Albright attended Moorhead State University, graduating with a B.S. in business administration.

Minnesota House of Representatives
Albright was first elected to the Minnesota House of Representatives in 2012.

Abortion 
Albright is anti-abortion-rights with "no exceptions" and, when specifically asked, claimed that he believed a 10-year-old rape victim should be forced to give birth to her rapist's child.

Personal life
Albright is married to his wife, Marianne. They have three children and reside in Prior Lake, Minnesota. He is a financial advisor.

References

External links

Rep. Tony Albright official Minnesota House of Representatives website
Rep. Tony Albright official campaign website

1962 births
21st-century American politicians
Living people
Republican Party members of the Minnesota House of Representatives
Minnesota State University Moorhead alumni
People from Prior Lake, Minnesota